The 2010 NCAA Division II men's basketball tournament involved 64 schools playing in a single-elimination tournament to determine the national champion of men's NCAA Division II college basketball as a culmination of the 2009–10 basketball season. It began on March 13, 2010. The tournament was won by the California State Polytechnic University, Pomona (Cal Poly Pomona) men's basketball team, which defeated Indiana University of Pennsylvania, 65–53, in the title game.  The championship was the first in the Broncos' history after ending runner-up in 2009.

Regionals

Central – Mankato, Minnesota
Location: Taylor Center Host: Minnesota State University, Mankato

South Central – Wichita Falls, Texas
Location: D.L. Ligon Coliseum Host: Midwestern State University

Atlantic – Indiana, Pennsylvania
Location: Memorial Field House Host: Indiana University of Pennsylvania

South – Russellville, Arkansas
Location: Tucker Coliseum Host: Arkansas Tech University

Midwest – Owensboro, Kentucky
Location: Owensboro Sportscenter Host: Kentucky Wesleyan College

West – Bellingham, Washington
Location: Sam Carver Gymnasium Host: Western Washington University

East – North Easton, Massachusetts
Location: Merkert Gymnasium Host: Stonehill College

Southeast – Augusta, Georgia
Location: Christenberry Fieldhouse Host: Augusta State University

Elite Eight – Springfield, Massachusetts 
Location: MassMutual Center Hosts: American International College and Naismith Memorial Basketball Hall of Fame

Game summaries

Elite Eight

Final Four

National Championship Game

All-tournament team
 Dahir Nasser (Cal Poly-Pomona)
 Matt Schneck (Saint Cloud State)
 Austin Swift (Cal Poly-Pomona)
 Darryl Webb (Indiana University of Pennsylvania)
 Taylor Witt (Saint Cloud State)

See also
2010 NCAA Division II women's basketball tournament
2010 NCAA Division I men's basketball tournament
2010 NCAA Division III men's basketball tournament
2010 NAIA Division I men's basketball tournament
2010 NAIA Division II men's basketball tournament

References
 2010 NCAA Division II men's basketball tournament jonfmorse.com

Sources
 
 2010 NCAA Men's Basketball Championship Tournament Records and Statistics: Division II men's basketball Championship

NCAA Division II men's basketball tournament
Tournament
NCAA Division II basketball tournament
NCAA Division II basketball tournament
Basketball in Wichita Falls, Texas